Clint Burnham (born 1962 in Comox, British Columbia) is a Canadian writer and academic.

He published the poetry collections Be Labour Reading (1997) and Buddyland (2000), and the short story collection Airborne Photo (1999), before publishing his debut novel Smoke Show in 2005. The novel was a shortlisted finalist for the Ethel Wilson Fiction Prize in 2006.

He was a ReLit Award nominee in the poetry category in 2018 for Pound @ Guantanamo (2017), and in the short fiction category in 2022 for White Lie (2021).

He has also published the poetry collections Rental Van (2007) and The Benjamin Sonnets (2009), and numerous academic non-fiction works on literature, art and architecture. He is a professor of English at Simon Fraser University.

His poems "Rent-a-Marxist" and "An Evening at Home" were anthologized in Seminal: The Anthology of Canada's Gay Male Poets (2007).

References

1962 births
Living people
20th-century Canadian non-fiction writers
20th-century Canadian poets
20th-century Canadian short story writers
20th-century Canadian male writers
21st-century Canadian non-fiction writers
21st-century Canadian novelists
21st-century Canadian poets
21st-century Canadian short story writers
21st-century Canadian male writers
Canadian male novelists
Canadian male poets
Canadian male short story writers
Canadian male non-fiction writers
People from Comox, British Columbia
Academic staff of Simon Fraser University
Writers from Vancouver
Canadian LGBT poets
Canadian LGBT novelists
Canadian gay writers
Gay poets
Gay novelists
21st-century Canadian LGBT people
20th-century Canadian LGBT people